Ann Tyrrell (February 6, 1909 – July 20, 1983) was an American stage, film and television actress. Tyrrell is best known for her roles in both of the Ann Sothern CBS sitcoms Private Secretary (1953–1957) and The Ann Sothern Show (1958–1961).

Career
A native of Whatcom County in northwestern Washington state, Tyrrell won her first film role in 1949 at the age of forty as Miss Swanson in Bride for Sale. She and Reagan shared birthdays, but she was two years his senior.

In 1953, she appeared unbilled as Mary Tudor sister of Queen Elizabeth I in the M-G-M historical drama Queen Bess and in 1955, she appeared in the film Seven Angry Men with Raymond Massey and Jeffrey Hunter. Between film appearances, Tyrrell guest starred in episodes of Adventures of Superman, The Adventures of Kit Carson, and The People's Choice.

Later years
After retiring from acting, Tyrrell worked as a dialectician and made recordings for the blind.

Tyrrell made her final public appearance in a phone interview on the ABC morning program Good Morning America in November, 1982. In that installment, host Joan Lunden interviewed on camera the cast of both Private Secretary and The Ann Sothern Show which included Sothern, Don Porter, and Jesse White. Tyrrell was not able to physically join them, but she was able to converse with Lunden and reminisce with her former co-stars via telephone from her home in California.

Death
On July 20, 1983, Tyrrell died of a heart attack at a Pasadena, California hospital at the age of 74.

Filmography

References

External links
 

1909 births
1983 deaths
20th-century American actresses
Actresses from Washington (state)
People from Whatcom County, Washington
American film actresses
American stage actresses
American television actresses
Actresses from Los Angeles